Los Grandes Éxitos en Español (The Greatest Hits in Spanish) is the title of a 1999 release by Cypress Hill. It was certified Platinum by the RIAA.

Album Information
With exception of the last track, which was previously unreleased, together with "Latin Lingo," and "Tres Equis" which appeared on Cypress Hill, the album features old songs with new Spanish lyrics.

The instrumental of the song 'Siempre Peligroso', would later be re-used in 'We Live This Shit', on Skull & Bones.

A limited edition CD version features an additional 'hidden' bonus track - "Latin Lingo" (Blackout Mix). An edited 'clean' version of this mix later appeared on the Stash EP.

Reception

Spin (1/00, p. 127) - 8 out of 10 - "...recutting some of their best tracks in a nimble, L.A.-spawned 'espanol' that never sounds literal or clumsy..."
Q magazine (8/00, p. 124) - 3 stars out of 5 - "Weird that not getting a single word makes them seem somehow more likeable."
Alternative Press (1/00, p. 79) - 4 out of 5 - "...new takes on old favorites...put this album 'pista y hombros' above your everyday best-of comp."
CMJ (12/27/99, p. 26) - "Hip-hop's stoned raiders reinterpret their most well known anthems in their native tongue on this exceptional Spanish-language greatest hits package....interesting new spins on old classics, while later cuts...benefit greatly from the creative switch..."
Vibe (2/00, p. 167) - "...they satisfy the hunger [for a full-length album 'en espanol'] like a plateful of 'carne asada'....[It] not only breaks the language barriers but also further validates Cypress Hill's importance as a hip hop entity..."
NME (5/27/00, p. 40) - 6 out of 10 - "It's as good as its many words....enough to send you loco en el coco."

Track listing

Charts
Album - Billboard (North America)

Sales and certifications

References 

Cypress Hill albums
Spanish-language albums
1999 greatest hits albums
Albums produced by DJ Muggs
Columbia Records compilation albums
Ruffhouse Records compilation albums